OnePixcel was a Japanese idol girl group formed in 2015. They released their debut EP, Zero, on June 22, 2016. They disbanded on June 25, 2021.

History
OnePixcel was formed in late 2015 and debuted in June 2016 with the EP, Zero. Their first single "Tondeke / Analoganize" was released in November 2016, followed by their second single "Time" in April 2017. They released their first studio album, Monochrome, in October 2017. Their third single, "Lagrima", was released in March 2018 as their major label debut and was featured in Dragon Ball Super as the ending theme. Their fourth single, "Sparkle", was released in August 2018, followed by their fifth single, "Girls Don't Cry" in December 2018, and their sixth single, "Final Call", in May 2019. They released their second studio album, Libre, in February 2020. They released their seventh and final single, "Sha La La La", in November 2020. They announced on March 29, 2021, that they would hold their final concert on June 25.

Members

Final line-up
Nanami Tanabe (田辺奈菜美)
Ami Kanuma (鹿沼亜美)
Ayaka Den (傳彩夏)

Former
Raia Kozuka (狐塚来愛)

Discography

Studio albums

Extended plays

Singles

References

External links
Official website

Japanese girl groups
Japanese idol groups
Japanese pop music groups
Musical groups from Tokyo
Musical groups established in 2015
2015 establishments in Japan